The following is the standings of the Iran Football's 2nd Division 2003-04 football season.

National Group

Region Groups

North Group

South Group

See also
 2003–04 Azadegan League
 2003–04 Hazfi Cup
 Iranian Super Cup
 2003–04 Iranian Futsal Super League

3
League 2 (Iran) seasons